Ümit Erdim (born 15 June 1985) is a Turkish actor and pilot.

Life and career 
Erdim is a graduate of İzmit Atılım Anatolian High School. Between 1998–2003, he worked as an actors in the youth unit of Kocaeli Metropolitan Municipal City Theatre. There he met fellow actor Caner Özyurtlu with whom he moved to Istanbul and founded an agency in Kadıköy. Soon he was offered role in different television series. He first appeared as a guest in a few episodes of Böyle mi Olacaktı and Gönül. 

He played leading role in series such as hit teen series Hayat Bilgisi  and popular fantasy child series Selena. He also made his cinematic debut in 2015 with a role in Can Tertip.

In January 2015, he joined the judging panel of the third season of Benzemez Kimse Sana.

Filmography

TV series 
 Böyle mi Olacaktı? (guest appearance) 2002
 Hayat Bilgisi (Var Mısın Arif) Kanal D / Show TV 2003–2006
 Gönül (Cemali) Kanal D 2006
 Selena (Zülfikar Yıldız) atv 2006–2009
 Adanalı (guest appearance) atv 2008–2009
 Teyzanne (Damperli) Star TV 2009
 Doksanlar atv 2013
 Kapanmadan Kazan (guest appearance) atv 2013
 Şefim (guest appearance) atv 2013
 Doksanlar atv 2013
 Şampiyon 2019–

Film 
 Can Tertip - 2015 (Şakir Tahta)
 Kan Kardeşler - 2016 (Şakir)
 Bücür - 2018
 Kim Daha Mutlu - 2019

TV programs 
 Pasaport
 Adam Asmaca
 Mami
 Benzemez Kimse Sana (Judge) Star TV 2012 / 2015

References

External links 
 
 

Turkish male film actors
Turkish male television actors
Turkish male stage actors
People from Kocaeli Province
1985 births
Living people